Alejandro Pacheco (born September 5, 1972) is a speaker, commentator and Venezuelan TV sports producer. He worked in his own TV and executive production and host Binomio Venezuela, a TV horse showjumping on Meridiano TV. He also is the creator and administrator of the website binomiovenezuela.com, with all the coverage of the Venezuelan Equestrian Show jumping. Moreover, Alejandro is the director of Best Jumping Media, a portal where advertising and media handles several major Show Jumping (horse) riders in the world. This Website presents all information and events of international show jumper and is accompanied by its Spanish version Tu Mundo Ecuestre, with major relevance for Latin American riders news, where its creation of the Latin Ranking Riders and Pan Am Ranking riders. Today Alejandro Pacheco has been dedicated to full coverage of Show Jumping World Championships and all international equestrian competition events, but always dedicated to the sport and providing information on baseball, football, basketball and other disciplines of interest to lovers of the world of sports.

Early career 
Alejandro Pacheco is a civil engineer, currently dedicated to his passion, the sports. It began in Radio Deportes 1590AM their first steps into the sports broadcaster in February 1999, with the help of a pioneer in Venezuelan Sports journalism Herman "Chiquitin" Ettedgui and uncle of nascent commentator, continuing with the family blood sport; he went to his first experience. Pacheco was transmitting the results of Major League Baseball (MLB), US professional basketball (NBA) and various topics of the day in space "Walk on the Press" with the big sportman journalist "Chiquitin" Ettedgui, where he quickly caught the attention of the crowd to bring the audience for the first time and every day, all results of Venezuelans baseball players from the Majors, going through all the Minor League Baseball (AAA, AA, A and rookie), Independent baseball league, Mexican League and Japan League, starring by Venezuelan players, being the first most complete daily summary in different media in the country. His internship at Radio Deporte by 4 years, led him to share the microphone with characters of the time as Duilio Di Giacomo, Reyes Alamo, Ramon Corro, Tony Cruz, Rene Rincon, Herman "Chiquitin" Ettedgui among others.

Television career 
Although it began in 2000 his career television, it was until November 2003, after completing its cycle on Radio Deporte, he joined the Meridiano TV staff with Ramon Corro to present the sports magazine "La Voz del Fanatico"(Voice of the Fan), one of the most popular Venezuelan TV programs and especially for sports fans. With audience participation and a long list of celebrity guests, the show was presented Monday to Friday, totally live, which lasted eight years (August 2011), leaving a large footprint in the Venezuelan TV dynamic duo of the mornings (the charismatic Ramon Corro and Alejandro Pacheco, baptized by broadcaster Humberto "Beto" Perdomo as El Galan del Comentario (The handsome of comment), with a before and after in such programs.

During that period of pleasant experiences (2003–2011), Alejandro joined the staff of Meridiano Television for transmission of Venezuelan Professional Basketball League (LPB) and National Basket Association (NBA). He also participated in the Venezuelan Professional Baseball League (LVBP), Major League Baseball (MLB), Caribbean Series and World Baseball Classic. Several important events were responsible for Alejandro Pacheco, who also was in several Olympic Games, Central American and Caribbean Games, like the South American Basketball and Bolivarian Games.

By early 2011 starts a new cycle in Meridiano Television screen with Binomio Venezuela its entire production and executive production, shared with dual functions sport talk show "La Voz del Fanatico" (Voice of the Fan), culminating broadcasting months later. Turning 180 degrees in what was unusual to see him on television's day, Alejandro bursts with a different concept, which to this day remains on the grid transmission of the prestigious television station. Being Talented, Host and Producer of the new TV program, Pacheco has all the national circuit specialty skills, one of the few programs to fully cover calendar of competitions and also international events, from the place of events in major world circuits from the United States in Wellington, Kentucky, Washington DC, Virginia, New York, North Carolina, Ocala, Tryon and other important places as Canada in Spruce Meadows, Calgary and Europe in Spain and France. Regional events such as the American and South American Championship Jumping in Guayaquil, Ecuador (2011) and Rosario, Argentina (2013), Bolivarian Games in Peru (2013) and Colombia (2017), 2014 Central American and Caribbean Games, 2018 Central American and Caribbean Games and WEG in Normandy, France 2014 (FEI World Equestrian Games) and Tryon, USA 2018; as the final of the Furusiyya FEI Nations Cup in Barcelona, Spain (2014).

Already filled in horses and specialty national and global show jumping, Alejandro Pacheco creates a website with all national information (Venezuela) in 2011 www.binomiovenezuela.com, after that Tu Mundo Ecuestre in 2013 (www.tumundoecuestre.com) with the aim of informing Spanish World Equestrian showjumping and especially the performance of Latin American riders to complete with Best Jumping Media (www.bestjumpingmedia.com) in 2014, presenting and managing all world events information, like the representation of press and publicity of several important riders in the world ranking.

References 

1972 births
Living people
American sports journalists
American television hosts
American horse racing announcers
Horse racing in the United States
Major League Baseball broadcasters
People in horse racing
Venezuelan television presenters